Magic Flyer also known as Percy's Railway, is a small, oval-circuit steel roller coaster made by Bradley and Kaye that opened in 1971. The coaster is located in the Whistlestop Park area of Six Flags Magic Mountain in Valencia, California. It was an unknown-named coaster at the former Beverly Park prior to operating at Magic Mountain.

History
Magic Flyer was originally located at Beverly Park in the 1940s. It was relocated to Six Flags Magic Mountain in 1971 where it began operation as Clown Coaster. In the 1984-1985 off-season the ride was renamed and rethemed to Wile E. Coyote Coaster to suit the theme of the nearby Bugs Bunny World.

In 1998, the roller coaster closed for 3 years to be redesigned to look like the larger Goliath roller coaster, located in the same park. The old supports were replaced with supports that resembled those found on the Goliath and the trains were rebuilt from the chassis up. It was repainted with Goliath's color scheme and given the name Goliath Jr. (Goliath Junior) to reopen in 2001.

In the 2007-2008 off-season Goliath Jr. was rethemed to Percy's Railway to match Six Flags Magic Mountain's new kids zone, Thomas Town. Similarly to the Goliath Jr. makeover, the cars were rebuilt to resemble Percy the Small Engine (the leading car) and his Troublesome Trucks (the two following cars), all from the television series Thomas & Friends.

In late 2010, Six Flags began the process of removing licensed theming from attractions. They terminated several licenses including that for Thomas the Tank Engine. The Thomas Town at Six Flags Magic Mountain has been renamed and rethemed to Whistlestop Park which reopened on March 19, 2011. Percy's Railway was now again rethemed and renamed to Magic Flyer.

Ride
The train exits out of the station and directly ascends the  lift hill. The track then makes a small dip before navigating a 180° turn to the left. A second small dip is followed by another ascent before making a second 180° turn to the left and returning to the station.

References

External links
Magic Flyer at the Roller Coaster DataBase

Roller coasters in California
Roller coasters introduced in 1971
Roller coasters operated by Six Flags
Six Flags Magic Mountain